Hush Money is a 1931 American pre-Code comedy-drama film featuring Joan Bennett, Hardie Albright, Owen Moore, Myrna Loy, and George Raft. The movie was directed by Sidney Lanfield.

Cast
Joan Bennett as Joan Gordon
Hardie Albright as Stuart Elliot
Owen Moore as Steve Pelton
Myrna Loy as Flo Curtis
C. Henry Gordon as Jack Curtis
George Raft as Maxie

References

External links

1931 films
1931 comedy-drama films
American comedy-drama films
1930s English-language films
American black-and-white films
Films directed by Sidney Lanfield
Films with screenplays by Dudley Nichols
Fox Film films
1930s American films
English-language comedy-drama films